The OFC Women's Champions League is the top-tier women's football club competition in Oceania. It involves the top clubs from countries affiliated with the Oceania Football Confederation (OFC).

The first edition is set for June 2023.

Inaugural edition 
The first edition was planned for March 2023 but then postponed to 1 to 10 June.

The tournament is to be played in Papua New Guinea and will feature six teams from the region.

See also
OFC Champions League

References

External links
, oceaniafootball.com

Women
Women's association football competitions in Oceania
Multi-national professional sports leagues
2023 establishments in Oceania
Recurring sporting events established in 2023